Ministry of Communications and Technology may refer to:

Ministry of Communications and Technology (Ghana)
Ministry of Communications and Technology (Syria), the ministry that is responsible for developing government communications and information policies and setting strategies and implementation programs in this field